David Allan Tilson (born March 19, 1941) is a politician in Ontario, Canada. He was a Progressive Conservative member of the Legislative Assembly of Ontario from 1990 to 2002, and served as the Member of Parliament (MP) for the riding of Dufferin—Caledon from 2004 to 2019 as a member of the Conservative Party. When he left office, he was the oldest serving MP in the 42nd Parliament.

Background
Tilson was educated at the University of New Brunswick and Queen's University, and began practicing law in Orangeville, Ontario in 1970. He served as a trustee on the Dufferin County Board of Education for two terms, and then as a municipal councillor in Orangeville for six years. In the latter capacity, he was the founding Chair of Orangeville's Blue Box program and a Director of the Association of Municipalities of Ontario. He also served on the board of Westminster United Church.

Ontario politics
Tilson was elected to the Ontario legislature in the provincial election of 1990, defeating incumbent Liberal Mavis Wilson in Dufferin—Peel by 572 votes. The New Democratic Party won this election, and Tilson spent the next five years as an opposition member.

The Ontario Tories won a majority government in the provincial election of 1995, and Tilson greatly increased his margin of victory, defeating Wilson by almost 15,000 votes in a rematch. He was appointed chair of the government caucus in November 1997.

Tilson won another landslide re-election victory for the new riding of Dufferin—Peel—Wellington—Grey in the 1999 election.  On April 2, 2002, he resigned his seat in the legislature to allow Premier Ernie Eves (who had been elected party leader without holding a seat) to run as a parachute candidate in a by-election. In 2003–04, he served as vice-chair of the Ontario Municipal Board.

Federal politics
Tilson ran for the House of Commons of Canada in the federal election of 2004 and defeated incumbent Liberal Murray Calder by a margin of 43% to 39% in the new riding of Dufferin—Caledon.

Tilson supported plans to cut farm support programs, including the AgriRecovery Program, by $2 billion over the next year.

Tilson did not run for reelection in the 2019 federal election.

Electoral record

Federal

Provincial

References

External links
 
 
 

1941 births
Conservative Party of Canada MPs
Living people
Members of the House of Commons of Canada from Ontario
Members of the United Church of Canada
People from Orangeville, Ontario
Politicians from Toronto
Progressive Conservative Party of Ontario MPPs
Queen's University at Kingston alumni
University of New Brunswick alumni
Lawyers in Ontario
21st-century Canadian politicians